The Fiat Centoventi EV is an electric concept car from the Italian car manufacturer Fiat, unveiled in March 2019 at the Geneva Motor Show. The name Centoventi is in recognition of the company's 120th anniversary. It previews the design of the next Fiat Panda.

The Centoventi is designed to be customisable and upgradeable with a selection of battery packs, with a standard base model of one battery providing  of range. The underfloor batteries can be added by a garage in under five minutes. The charging port is positioned in front of the windscreen and incorporates a cable reel for the cable. 

Fiat claims the modular battery design will allow this to be "the least expensive BEV on the market", but no production date was announced. 

The interior is designed for owners to personalise with a patented interlocking mounting system.

References

External links

Electric concept cars
Centoventi
Cars introduced in 2019